Ophiaster formosus is a marine, unicellular species of coccolithophore in the genus Ophiaster, first described by Gran in 1912.

References

Haptophyte species